Andre Gaines is an American film producer, director and financier. He produced and directed The One and Only Dick Gregory (2021) for Showtime, which premiered at the Tribeca Film Festival. He also executive produced the critically-acclaimed HBO documentary series The Lady and the Dale. In 2020, Gaines produced the reboot of Stephen King’s Children of the Corn in Queensland, Australia. The project was one of only two movies filming at the time amidst the global Covid-19 pandemic shut down. The protocols set forth by Gaines, producer Lucas Foster, and other crew served as the guidebook for all filming during the pandemic.

Early life and education
Gaines was born in Toledo, Ohio. He received a dual major in chemistry and journalism from Northwestern University, and an MFA from New York University Tisch School of the Arts.

Filmography 
 Glorious Empire (2021; producer)
 The One and Only Dick Gregory (2021; producer, writer, director)
 The Lady and the Dale (2021; executive producer)
 Children of the Corn (2020; executive producer)
 The Immortal Warrior (2020; producer)
 Bill Nye: Science Guy (2017; executive producer)
 Bricks in Motion (2016; executive producer)
 Da Sweet Blood of Jesus (2014; executive producer)
 The Purple Onion (2014; executive producer)
 Brazilian Western (2013)
 Rio 2096: A Story of Love and Fury (2013)
 Ladder to Damascus (2013)

References

External links 
 
 
 

American film directors
American film producers
Living people
People from Toledo, Ohio
Northwestern University alumni
Tisch School of the Arts alumni
Year of birth missing (living people)